Lilavati's Daughters is a collection of nearly a hundred biographical essays on women scientists of India. Published by Indian Academy of Sciences (Bangalore) in 2008, the book was edited by Rohini Godbole and Ram Ramaswamy. Reviews have appeared in The Hindu, Nature and C&E News  among other places.  The book contains brief biographical and autobiographical sketches of women scientists working in India. Covering a range of disciplines, in these essays the scientists talk of what brought them to science, what kept their interest alive, and what has helped them achieve some measure of distinction in their careers. This collection represent the cultural diversity of the country as well as a diverse range of disciplines, so that any student could gain from the insights and experiences of professional women to whom they may be able to relate at many levels.

[The title of the collection is a nod to the 12th-century treatise, Lilavati, written by the Indian mathematician Bhāskara II wherein problems in  arithmetic, algebra, geometry, etc. are discussed via poetic conversations addressed to his daughter Lilavati.]

The book has been translated in Malayalam as "Leelavatiyude Pennmakkal", published by the Kerala Sasthra Sahithya Parishath. A shorter (and different) version of Lilavati's Daughters was brought out as 
"The Girl's Guide to a Life in Science" edited by Ram Ramaswamy, Rohini Godbole and Mandakini Dubey (co-published with Young Zubaan, New Delhi).  This is also an initiative of the Women in Science (WiS) Panel of the Indian Academy of Sciences, Bangalore.

Contents
There are short biographies of the botanist E. K. Janaki Ammal, the chemists Asima Chatterjee and Darshan Ranganathan, India's first female physician Anandibai Joshee, the anthropologist Iravati Karve, the biochemist Kamala Sohonie, the medical researcher Kamal Ranadive, physicist B. Vijayalakshmi and meteorologist Anna Mani. Autobiographical sketches by a number of distinguished scientists, many of who are currently working in India complete the book.  Further details can be found on the Indian Academy of Sciences website.

References

2008 non-fiction books
21st-century Indian books
Books about scientists
Indian biographies
 Lilavati's Daughters